The North Shore Synagogue is a Modern Orthodox Jewish synagogue located in the Sydney suburb of , New South Wales, Australia. Founded in 1947, and having built its synagogue in 1950, it is the oldest synagogue on Sydney's North Shore.

Overview
For thirty years the rabbi at the North Shore Synagogue was Rabbi David Rogut  who retired in 2003. The current Rabbi is Rabbi Paul Lewin. North Shore Synagogue also has a Chazan, Zvi Teichtahl who came to the synagogue in 2008. Past Chazans have been Rabbi Binyamin Tanny and Danny Sloman. The North Shore Synagogue contains a Choir, a Book group called "One Chapter at a Time" and a North Shore Jewish Women's group. The current President of the North Shore Synagogue is Ken Wolfsohn. Past presidents include Trevor Collins, Ken Wolfsohn, Sarah Zukerman, Calvin Stein and David Blitz. On Friday nights, Saturdays and religious festivals the synagogue conducts a children's service which is led by various youth over the age of fourteen.

The synagogue houses the Reverend Katz Library that has more than 5000 books available for the community to use.

See also 

History of the Jews in Australia
List of synagogues in Australia and New Zealand
The North Shore Synagogue website https://nss.asn.au

References

External links 

Synagogues in Sydney
Modern Orthodox synagogues
Lindfield, New South Wales
1950 establishments in Australia
Synagogues completed in 1950
Orthodox synagogues in Australia